Emmanuel Kwadwo Adu is a Ghanaian politician who served as member of parliament for Abetifi  from 1969 to 1972.

Early life and education 
Emmanuel is a native of Abetifi, a constituency in the Eastern Region of Ghana. He was born in 1945 and he attended Norwood Technical College, London.  From 14 March 2006 to 13 June 2014 He was ambassador to Porto Novo (Benin) and was West African representative of Scancem International, and CEO of Judah (Alabado) Ltd. He is enthusiast of sports, and was the vice president of the Ghana Football Association 1992–1994, and president of Kumasi Asante Kotoko Football Club from 1994 to 1996.

Politics 
Emmanuel was the Member of the Parliament who represented Abetifi, Constituency in the Eastern region of Ghana in the Parliament of the Second Republic of Ghana  on ticket of the Progress Party (PP). He was elected into office after he won his polls in the 1969 Ghanaian parliamentary election. The Parliament started on 1 October 1969 and his tenure ended on 13 January 1972 when the Parliament was dissolved. Emmanuel polled 6,671 votes out the total valid votes cast while his opponent Alfred Kye who was Independent polled 1,930 votes of the total valid votes cast. He was among the eight ambassadors appointed by president John Agyekum Kufuor on 15 September 2001 in Accra as he was appointed as the Ghanaian ambassador to Denmark. He was appointed to the post in 2001 by the PNP Government and has been equipped in bringing many businesses to Ghana including Telenor and Norsk Hydro-, both from Norway.

Personal life 
He is a Christian. He is a Businessman.

See also 

 Busia government
 List of MPs elected in the 1969 Ghanaian parliamentary election

References

Ghanaian MPs 1969–1972
1945 births
Living people
Ghanaian Christians
20th-century Ghanaian politicians
People from Eastern Region (Ghana)
Academic staff of the University of Ghana Medical School